The Never Ending Tour is the popular name for Bob Dylan's endless touring schedule since June 7, 1988.

Background
The first leg of the tour, taking place solely in North America, was announced on February 12, 2015, with several dates in Memphis, Tulsa, Kansas City and St. Louis being announced in the following days and weeks.

Dylan planned an extensive tour of Europe split between the summer and fall. During the summer Dylan and his band performed mainly at festivals and large arenas. During the fall Dylan and his band performed mainly in theatres and mid-sized arenas, including a five-night residency at the Royal Albert Hall in London. His performances at the Royal Albert Hall were awarded a five-star review from the Financial Times and his performances at the O2 Apollo in Manchester were given a four-star rating by the Manchester Evening News.

Set list
This set list is representative of the performance on October 25, 2015 in London, England. It does not represent all concerts for the duration of the tour.

Set One
"Things Have Changed"
"She Belongs to Me"
"Beyond Here Lies Nothin'"
"What'll I Do"
"Duquesne Whistle"
"Melancholy Mood"
"Pay in Blood"
"I'm a Fool to Want You"
"Tangled Up in Blue"

Set Two
"High Water (For Charley Patton)"
"Why Try to Change Me Now?"
"Early Roman Kings"
"The Night We Called It a Day"
"Spirit on the Water"
"Scarlet Town"
"All or Nothing at All"
"Long and Wasted Years"
"Autumn Leaves"

Encore
"Blowin' in the Wind"
"Love Sick"

Tour dates

Cancellations and rescheduled shows

Notes

References

External links
BobLinks – Comprehensive log of concerts and set lists
BobDylan.com – Bob Dylan's Official Website Tour Page
Bjorner's Still on the Road – Information on recording sessions and performances

Bob Dylan concert tours
2015 concert tours